Guillaume Beghin (born 26 April 1997) is a French professional footballer who plays for  club Stade Briochin. He plays as a midfielder.

Club career
Beghin made his senior debut for RC Lens in a 3–2 Ligue 2 win over Tours FC on 13 January 2017. On 14 June 2017 he signed a three-year professional contract with the club.

Beghin was loaned to Boulogne for the 2018–19 season. In August 2019 he was released by Lens and signed a two-year deal with Boulogne, with the option to extend by a further year.

On 22 June 2022, Beghin signed with Stade Briochin.

References

External links
 
 
 
 
 RC Lensois Profile

1997 births
Living people
People from Seclin
Sportspeople from Nord (French department)
Association football midfielders
French footballers
RC Lens players
US Boulogne players
Stade Briochin players
Ligue 2 players
Championnat National players
Footballers from Hauts-de-France